Agrampela (before 1928: Πορετζού - Poretzou) is a village in the municipal unit of Aroania, Achaea, Greece.  In 2011, it had a population of 41 for the village and 99 for the community, which includes the village Platanitsa. It is situated in the southern foothills of the Mount Erymanthos. It is 2 km northwest of Plaka, 8 km east of Kalentzi and 26 km southwest of Kalavryta.

Population

History

In the 1700 Venetian census, the village had 29 families. The village was known as Poretzou (Πορετζού) until 1928. Its inhabitants were known as Poretsanos, which became a surname for several people. Together with Platanitsa, it was a municipal district of Lampeia until 1912, when it became an independent community. The community was transferred from the Elis Prefecture to Achaea in 1974.

See also
List of settlements in Achaea

References

External links
Agrambela at the GTP Travel Pages

Populated places in Achaea